In geometry, a diminished rhombic dodecahedron is a rhombic dodecahedron with one or more vertices removed. This article describes diminishing one 4-valence vertex. This diminishment creates one new square face while 4 rhombic faces are reduced to triangles. It has 13 vertices, 24 edges, and 13 faces. It has C4v symmetry, order 8.

Like the rhombic dodecahedron, the long diagonal of each rhombic face is  times the length of the short diagonal, so that the acute angles on each face measure arccos(), or approximately 70.53°.

Self-dual
Like the dihedral symmetry pyramids, and elongated pyramids, it is self-dual, with the dual geometry inverted across the axis of symmetry. It is one of three self-dual tridecahedra with C4v symmetry.

Space-filling
This polyhedron along with the cube is space-filling, like the rhombic dodecahedral honeycomb. Six diminished points come together to form cubic holes.

Cartesian coordinate
It has 13 of 14 Cartesian coordinates of the rhombic dodecahedron are:
8: (±1, ±1, ±1)
1: (2, 0, 0)
2: (0, ±2, 0)
2: (0, 0, ±2)

Augmented cuboctahedron
The same topological polyhedron with different proportions can be constructed as an augmented cuboctahedron, with a square face augmented by a square pyramid. This construction requires merging of neighboring coparallel triangular faces into new 60° rhombic faces. This can also be seen as an asymmetric stellation of a cuboctahedron. It retains 5 square faces, and 4 equilateral triangle faces of the cuboctahedron.

The 13 Cartesian coordinate can be positioned as:
1: ( 2,  0,  0)
4: (±1, ±1,  0)
4: (±1,  0, ±1)
4: ( 0, ±1, ±1)

Augmenting two opposite squares will create a dihedral rhombic dodecahedron, doubling the symmetry to D4h symmetry, order 16. Augmenting pyramids on all six square faces, with merged faces will produce a regular octahedron, restoring full octahedral symmetry, order 48.

References 

 Symmetric Canonical Self-Dual Tridecahedra #7

Self-dual polyhedra